West Virginia Route 131 is a north–south state highway located in northern West Virginia. The northern terminus is at U.S. Route 19 in Shinnston. The southern terminus is at U.S. Route 50 in Bridgeport.

The part of WV 131 running north–south from US 50 past I-79 is former WV 73, which continued to Morgantown and Bruceton Mills along the I-79 and I-68 corridors. The remainder of WV 131, along Saltwell Road, was County Route 13. The numerators of county routes spurring from WV 131 still reflect these former numbers.

Major intersections

References

131
Transportation in Harrison County, West Virginia